Circle Records was a West German jazz record label established in 1976.

Circle Records Germany has been relaunched and continued its activities in 2022 by restoring and remastering their originals such as releasing the Chet Baker Paris recordings from 1980.

www.circlerecords.de

Discography

Albums

See also 
 List of record labels

References

Jazz record labels
German record labels
Record labels established in 1976
1976 establishments in Germany

de:Circle Records